José Ramon Infante Aguirre (born ) is a Mexican male  track cyclist. He competed at the 2010 and 2013 UCI Track Cycling World Championships.

References

External links
 Profile at cyclingarchives.com

1988 births
Living people
Mexican track cyclists
Mexican male cyclists
Place of birth missing (living people)